Milad Rabbani is an Iranian football defender who currently plays for Iranian football club Esteghlal Ahvaz in the Iran Pro League.

Club career
Rabbani started his career with Esteghlal Ahvaz from youth levels. He was promoted to the first team after relegation to Division 2 in 2011. He was a regular starter in his first season with Esteghlal Ahvaz while he helped them gain promotion to Division 1. In summer 2014 he joined Esteghlal Khuzestan with a 3-year contract. He made his debut for Esteghlal Khuzestan on 31 October 2014 against Sepahan as a starter.

Club career statistics

References

External links
 Milad Rabbani at PersianLeague.com
 Milad Rabbani at IranLeague.ir

1993 births
Living people
Iranian footballers
People from Dezful
Esteghlal Ahvaz players
Esteghlal Khuzestan players
Sportspeople from Khuzestan province
Association football defenders